Miranda Tapsell (born 11 December 1987) is an Aboriginal Australian actress of both stage and screen, best known for her role as Cynthia in the Wayne Blair film The Sapphires and her 2015 performance as Martha Tennant in the Nine Network drama series Love Child. In 2016, she portrayed Fatima in the Stan series Wolf Creek.

Early life
Tapsell was born in Darwin, Northern Territory, on 11 December 1987 to Tony and Barbara Tapsell. When she was five the family moved to Jabiru in West Arnhem Land, where she grew up around Kakadu National Park. In 2004, when she was 16, Tapsell won the Bell Shakespeare Company regional performance scholarship. After finishing school she moved to Sydney to study at the National Institute of Dramatic Art (NIDA) from where she graduated in 2008.

Career
Miranda's first stage appearance was at the Jabiru Wind Festival in September, 1999. She sang as a student with the Jabiru Area School Choir.

Tapsell has been active both on stage and screen, starting with her 2008 performance in Dallas Winmar's play Yibiyung at the Belvoir Theatre, where she had the title role. In June 2010 she performed in A Midsummer Night's Dream at the Old Town Hall Ruins, Darwin. Later in that year she appeared as Ngala in Kamarra Bell-Wykes' Mother's Tongue at the Yirra Yaakin Theatre in Perth, a play about a young woman's connection to her Indigenous heritage. 2012 saw Tapsell as Bonita in the mini-series Mabo and then in the breakthrough role of Cynthia McRae, one of The Sapphires, Wayne Blair's film about a group of four Indigenous singers during the Vietnam War era. Tapsell topped the year off with her appearance as Teneka in the second episode of the ABC's Redfern Now.

Back in the theatre in 2013, Tapsell played a dual role (as Gillyagan and Muruli) in Andrew Bovell's The Secret River at the Sydney Theatre, a performance which earned her a nomination for the Helpmann Award for Best Female Actor in a Supporting Role in a Play. In 2014 Tapsell took on the role of Elizabeth, a young Indigenous woman, for a short film called Vote Yes which looked at issues around the 1967 referendum on including Aboriginal peoples in the census. The film was screened by the Recognise campaign, the movement seeking to recognise Indigenous Australians in the Australian Constitution. She appeared in four episodes of the ABC sketch programme Black Comedy. On the stage she played "Tiny Tim" Cratchit for a performance of Charles Dickens's A Christmas Carol at the Belvoir Theatre. While she was playing Tiny Tim at night, she was rehearsing for her next performance as a woman called Nona, who finds out her oldest sister is really her mother, in Louis Nowra's Radiance, also, conveniently, at the Belvoir Theatre.

Also in 2014 Tapsell became a member of the cast of the Channel 9 drama series Love Child, set in the 1960s. Her role is as an unmarried pregnant Indigenous woman, Martha Tennant, who ends up in a ward with several other unwed women in a fictitious hospital in Sydney's King's Cross at a time when it was taboo to be pregnant and not married. Her performance was extremely well received, garnering two Logies in May 2015, Best New Talent and the Graham Kennedy Award For Most Outstanding Newcomer. On reception of the first she urged the relevant people in the audience to "Put more beautiful people of colour on TV and connect viewers in ways which transcend race and unite us," adding, "That's the real team Australia." In 2016 she played Juliet in Justin Fleming's The Literati for Bell Shakespeare and Griffin's historic co-production of Molière's Les Femmes Savantes.

In 2017, 2018 and again in 2019 Tapsell starred as Charlotte Gibson in the Sydney Theatre Company production from playwright Nakkiah Lui, Black is the New White. Her role is a lawyer with a brilliant career who brings her non-Indigenous, unemployed experimental composer fiancé home to meet her family at Christmas.

Tapsell wrote a contribution entitled "Nobody Puts Baby Spice in a Corner" for the 2018 biographical anthology Growing Up Aboriginal In Australia, edited by Anita Heiss and published by Black Inc.

In April 2020 Tapsell's memoir, Top End Girl, was published by Hachette Australia.

In 2021 Tapsell was the co-host of the live television special Australia's Biggest Singalong! with Julia Zemiro.

Personal life
Tapsell is a Larrakia woman and lives in Melbourne with her husband, James Colley. The couple have a daughter, born in December 2021.

Filmography

Film

Television

Awards and nominations

References

External links

1987 births
Australian film actresses
Australian stage actresses
Australian television actresses
Indigenous Australian actresses
Living people
Logie Award winners
National Institute of Dramatic Art alumni
People from Darwin, Northern Territory
21st-century Australian actresses